The Willberg River (also spelt Wilberg River) is a river of the West Coast Region of New Zealand's South Island. It initially flows northwest before turning southwest, reaching the Poerua River 12 kilometres south of Harihari.

See also
List of rivers of New Zealand

References

Rivers of the West Coast, New Zealand
Rivers of New Zealand
Westland District